Barbara Ewa Bubula (born 4 March 1963 in Kraków) is a Polish politician. She was elected to Sejm on 25 September 2005, getting 2832 votes in 13 Kraków district as a candidate from the Law and Justice list.

See also
Members of Polish Sejm 2005-2007

External links
Barbara Bubula - parliamentary page - includes declarations of interest, voting record, and transcripts of speeches.

1963 births
Living people
Politicians from Kraków
Members of the Polish Sejm 2005–2007
Women members of the Sejm of the Republic of Poland
Law and Justice politicians
21st-century Polish women politicians
Members of the Polish Sejm 2011–2015